The Somerset derby is a local derby in football in the United Kingdom between Yeovil Town and Bath City and sometimes Taunton Town and Weston-super-Mare, named after the county of Somerset. Though both are currently in non-League football, the two clubs are the most successful in Somerset, and up until the last Somerset Premier Cup, in which Yeovil beat Bath 3–0, the two held the record for the most number of wins, (24 each). The two clubs have played each other 272 times, making it one of the most contested derbies in English Football.

History 

The two clubs met for the first time in 1902, in which Yeovil won the game 2–0. The rivalry stems from location and league position, with Yeovil and Bath having played in the top tier of non-League football for the majority of their history. Tensions between Bath and Yeovil were said to be strongest in the 1960s and 1990s, with the two clubs playing each other over 272 times in all competitions. From the 1910s to the late 1990s Bath and Yeovil consistently occupied the same league.

The first game for which the grandstand at Twerton Park officially opened was an FA Cup-tie on November 12, 1932. Yeovil, at the time, were said to be much “much reviled” in Bath over the years. 5,345 watched Yeovil beat Bath 4–2. The paper reported that the crowd were ‘strangely silent’,  with Bath City fans stating “Losing to Yeovil always hurt”.

However, Since the turn of the century, Yeovil and Bath moved in opposite directions across the English football pyramid, with the two clubs being as many as five divisions apart from one another during the 2013–14 season. Having been promoted to the EFL Championship in 2013, Yeovil played second-tier football for the first time in their history during the 2013–14 season, at the same time, Bath were struggling in the sixth tier. Whilst the club were having one of the best periods in their history, Bath City were having one their worst, thus, local animosity between Bath and Yeovil dissipated. Albeit, Yeovil Town's decline since 2014 means that as of the 2022–23 season Bath City currently sit just one tier below.

All time results

Statistics

References 

 
Football clubs in England
National League (English football) clubs
City F.C.
Association football clubs established in 1889
Southern Football League clubs
1889 establishments in England
Football clubs in Somerset
Fan-owned football clubs in England
Railway association football teams in England
 
Sport in Yeovil